Thiruvaiyaru block is a revenue block in the Thiruvaiyaru taluk of Thanjavur district, Tamil Nadu, India. There are 40 villages in this block.

List of Panchayat Villages

References 

 

Revenue blocks of Thanjavur district